Eusphaerium purpureum is a species of beetle in the family Cerambycidae, and the only species in the genus Eusphaerium. It was described by Newmann in 1838.

References

Compsosomatini
Beetles described in 1838
Monotypic Cerambycidae genera